SquidNT was a port of the Squid proxy server to Microsoft's Windows NT-based operating systems. The SquidNT effort has since then been merged into the main Squid project (September 2006) and is maintained by Guido Serassio, one of the core developers of Squid. The name SquidNT is still often used for referring to Squid running on Windows but is not an official name.  The official name is Squid regardless of platform.

You can compile the source code with Minimalist GNU for Windows or Microsoft Visual Studio. But Windows support is still largely missing.

Squid for Windows may be installed and run from the command line. It may also be installed as a Windows service. There is no graphical user interface.

Compatibility
Squid for Windows can run on the following Windows operating systems:
Microsoft Windows NT 4.0
Microsoft Windows 2000
Microsoft Windows XP
Microsoft Windows Server 2003
Microsoft Windows Vista
Microsoft Windows Server 2008
Microsoft Windows 7

References 
 Squid FAQ: Does Squid run on Windows?

External links
 Official homepage for Squid for Windows
 Official homepage for Squid project

Free proxy servers
Windows network-related software
Windows Internet software